Lorena Navarro Domínguez (born 11 November 2000) is a Spanish professional footballer who plays as a forward for Primera División club Real Madrid CF.

Club career
Navarro started her career with Madrid CFF.

References

External links
 Profile at Real Madrid

2000 births
Living people
Women's association football forwards
Spanish women's footballers
Footballers from Madrid
Madrid CFF players
Real Madrid Femenino players
Primera División (women) players